Integrated Strategies is a global management consulting firm specializing in supply chain, strategic sourcing, logistics  and Six-Sigma. Founded in 1990,  the company has worked with over 200 companies worldwide. It is known for two things: taking out price/costs while enhancing supply chain performance and transferring the knowledge, content and tools to clients so they can replicate and sustain the results without external help. The company reports its team averages 20 years of experience and has developed more than 200 commodity strategies

History 
Integrated Strategies was founded in 1990.

References 

International management consulting firms